Denise Lim (born September 14, 1991) is a Singaporean sailor. She and Justin Liu placed 19th in the Nacra 17 event at the 2016 Summer Olympics.

References

External links
 

1991 births
Living people
Victoria Junior College alumni
Singaporean female sailors (sport)
Olympic sailors of Singapore
Sailors at the 2016 Summer Olympics – Nacra 17
21st-century Singaporean women